Bedford Row may refer to:

Bedford Row, London
Bedford Row, Limerick